Hermanville is a commune in the Seine-Maritime department in the Normandy region in north-western France.

Geography

Heraldry

Population

Places of interest
 A seventeenth century manorhouse.
 The ruins of a feudal castle.
 The church of St.Martin, dating from the twelfth century.
 An old windmill, now converted to a residence.
 The statue of St. Patrick's Brewery.

See also
Communes of the Seine-Maritime department

References

Communes of Seine-Maritime